Agostinho José Gomes Coelho Tavares Carvalho (born 6 January 1993) is a Portuguese footballer who plays for Canelas as a centre-back.

External links

1993 births
Living people
People from Ovar
Portuguese footballers
Association football defenders
Primeira Liga players
Liga Portugal 2 players
C.D. Feirense players
AD Fafe players
GD Bragança players
Anadia F.C. players
Lusitânia F.C. players
C.D.C. Montalegre players
Sportspeople from Aveiro District